Douyin, also known as TikTok internationally, is a Chinese short video platform owned by  Bytedance. Unlike TikTok, Douyin in China also allow users to upload longer form video, including provide original programs started in 2019.

Variety

Short drama

Exclusive

Movie

References 

Lists of television series by streaming service